Bears and Bad Men is a 1918 American silent comedy film directed by Larry Semon and featuring Stan Laurel.

Cast
 Larry Semon as Larry Cutshaw
 Madge Kirby as The Slawson Daughter
 Stan Laurel as Pete
 William McCall as Stranded actor (credited as Billy McCall)
 Blanche Payson as Maw Cutshaw
 Frank Alexander as Paw Slawson
 William Hauber
 Pete Gordon as Paw Cutshaw
 Mae Laurel as Scared Woman
 Bessie the Bear
 Brownie the Bear

Reception
Like many American films of the time, Bears and Bad Men was subject to cuts by city and state film censorship boards. For example, the Chicago Board of Censors required a cut, in Reel 1, of a scene with a man looking at a goat and putting it off of his lap after water is seen pouring from a bucket.

See also
 List of American films of 1918

References

External links

1918 films
1918 short films
American silent short films
American black-and-white films
1918 comedy films
Films directed by Larry Semon
Films about bears
Silent American comedy films
American comedy short films
1910s American films